Palatinate or county palatine may refer to:

the territory or jurisdiction of a count palatine

United Kingdom and Ireland
County palatine in England and Ireland
Palatinate (colour), a shade of purple used by the City of Durham and Durham University
Palatinate (newspaper), student newspaper of Durham University

Germany
Electoral Palatinate 1085–1803, or County Palatine of the Rhine 1085–1803, a historic state of the Holy Roman Empire
preceded by Electoral Palatinate#County Palatine of Lotharingia 915–1085
Rhineland-Palatinate, federal state in western Germany
Palatinate (region) (former ), in Rhineland-Palatinate
Palatinate (wine region), in Rhineland-Palatinate
Palatinate Forest
Upper Palatinate, administrative region in Bavaria
Several sub-branches of the Palatine branch of the House of Wittelsbach:
House of Palatinate-Birkenfeld, based in 
Palatinate-Birkenfeld-Bischweiler, based in 
Palatinate-Birkenfeld-Gelnhausen, based in 
Palatinate-Birkenfeld-Zweibrücken, based in 
Palatinate-Kleeburg, based in 
Palatinate-Landsberg, based at Landsberg Castle in 
Palatinate-Mosbach, based in 
Palatinate-Mosbach-Neumarkt, based in 
Palatinate-Neuburg, based in 
House of Palatinate-Neumarkt, based in 
House of Palatinate-Simmern, based in 
Palatinate-Simmern and Zweibrücken, based in 
Palatinate-Simmern-Kaiserslautern, based in 
Palatinate-Simmern-Sponheim, based in 
Palatinate-Sulzbach, based in 
Palatinate-Sulzbach-Hilpoltstein, based in 
Palatine Zweibrücken, based in 
Palatinate-Zweibrücken-Birkenfeld, based in 
Palatinate-Zweibrücken-Vohenstrauss-Parkstein, based in

Greece
County Palatine of Cephalonia and Zakynthos

Hungary
Palatine of Hungary
List of palatines of Hungary

Poland
Voivodeships of Poland

Ukraine
Subdivisions of Zaporozhian Sich

See also
Palatine (disambiguation)
Pfalz (disambiguation)
Pfaltz (disambiguation)